Henley Field is a historic site in Lakeland, Florida. Built in 1922, it is located at 1125 North Florida Avenue. Clare Henley, for whom the park was named in 1942, encouraged its construction in an effort to persuade a professional baseball team to train there. On May 23, 1997, it was added to the U.S. National Register of Historic Places. Henley Field is located adjacent to Bryant Stadium, a football stadium.

Henley Field was used as the home ballpark of the fictional Class D Tampico Stogies in the 1987 HBO movie Long Gone which starred William Petersen and Virginia Madsen. During the film the stadium was known as Smythe Field.

 The ballpark was renovated prior to the 2002 season at a cost of $250,000. Henley was renovated to enable the Lakeland Tigers to play at the historic ballpark during the 2002 season. while their home field, Joker Marchant Stadium (which is also the current spring training home of the Detroit Tigers), was renovated during the 2002 season.

On September 2, 2015, the City of Lakeland announced it would sell Henley Field for $1 million to United Methodist Church-affiliated Florida Southern College, whose baseball team have used the park for the past 55 years.

References

External links

 Polk County listings at National Register of Historic Places
 Henley Field Ball Park at Florida's Office of Cultural and Historical Programs
 Henley Field Views – ‘’Ball Parks of the Minor Leagues’’
 Digital Ballparks: Henley Field Ballpark
 Ballpark Reviews: Henley Field Ballpark

Cleveland Indians spring training venues
Detroit Tigers spring training venues
Grapefruit League venues
Sports venues in Lakeland, Florida
National Register of Historic Places in Polk County, Florida
1925 establishments in Florida
Sports venues completed in 1925
Sports venues on the National Register of Historic Places in Florida
College baseball venues in the United States
Florida Southern Moccasins baseball